The 2008 Clemson Tigers baseball team represented Clemson University in the 2008 NCAA Division I baseball season. The team played home games at Doug Kingsmore Stadium in Clemson, SC.

The team was coached by Jack Leggett in his fifteenth season at Clemson. The Tigers posted a record of 31–27–1, finished in 8th place in the ACC, and failed to advance to NCAA Tournament play, ending a streak of appearances dating back to 1987.

Roster

Coaching Staff

Broadcasts

Radio 
On Wednesday, February 6, 2008, the Clemson Tigers Sports Network announced that it will broadcast 36 regular-season baseball games, while the other 20 regular-season games will be broadcast by WCCP-FM (104.9 FM) out of Clemson. Clemson Tiger Sports Network will broadcast the 30 ACC regular-season games along with the four games against South Carolina and both games against Georgia.

The network will also carry all postseason contests. The other 20 regular-season games will be carried by WCCP.

All games will be available online through WCCPFM.com.

TV 
Currently announced TV broadcasts:

Schedule/Results 

|- align="left" bgcolor="#bbbbbb"
| Feb. 22 || Mercer* ||colspan=8|Postponed (rain) Rescheduled for February 23
|- align="left" bgcolor="#bbffbb"
| Feb. 23 || Mercer* || #16 || Doug Kingsmore Stadium || Hinson (1–0) || Webster (0–1) ||  || W 12–5 || 1–0
|- align="left" bgcolor="bbffbb"
| Feb. 23 || Mercer* || #16 || Doug Kingsmore Stadium || Mitchell (1–0) || Boyette (0–1) || Vaughn (1) || W 6–5 || 2–0
|- align="left" bgcolor="bbffbb"
| Feb. 24 || Mercer* || #16 || Doug Kingsmore Stadium || Stoneburner (1–0) || Hoelzer (0–1) || || W 10–3 || 3–0
|- align="left" bgcolor="bbffbb"
| Feb. 27 || High Point* || #16 || Doug Kingsmore Stadium || Gullickson (1–0) || Scott (0–1) ||  || W 12–3 || 4–0
|- align="left" bgcolor="bbffbb"
|Feb. 29 || @ #45 College of Charleston*|| #16 || Patriot's Point Athletics Complex || Martin (1–0)  || Simpson (2–1) || Vaughn (2) || W 7–6 || 5–0 
|- align="left" bgcolor="FFBBBB"
|Mar. 1 || @ #3 South Carolina*|| #16 || Sarge Frye Field || Cisco (2–0) || Hinson (1–1) || || L 1–10  || 5–1
|- align="left" bgcolor="FFBBBB"
|Mar. 2 || #3 South Carolina*|| #16 || Doug Kingsmore Stadium || Cooper (1–1) || Mitchell (1–1)|| Johnson (1) || L 1–5  || 5–2
|- align="left" bgcolor="bbffbb"
|Mar. 5 || Wofford*|| #17 || Doug Kingsmore Stadium || Zoltak (1–0) || Summers (2–1) || Vaughn (3) || W 9–7 || 6–2
|- align="left" bgcolor="#bbbbbb"
|Mar. 7 || @ Wake Forest ||colspan=8|Postponed (rain) Rescheduled for March 8
|- align="left" bgcolor="FFBBBB"
|Mar. 8 || @ Wake Forest|| #17 || Gene Hooks Stadium || Negus (2–0) || Hinson (1–2) || Kledzik (1) || L 11–13 || 6–3 (0–1)
|- align="left" bgcolor="FFBBBB"
|Mar. 9 || @ Wake Forest|| #17 || Gene Hooks Stadium || Bullock (2–0) || Mitchell (1–2) || Kledzik (2) || L 3–5 || 6–4 (0–2)
|- align="left" bgcolor="bbffbb"
|Mar. 9 || @ Wake Forest|| #17 || Gene Hooks Stadium || Rothlin (1–0) || Kledzik (0–1) || Vaughn (4) || W 12–11 || 7–4 (1–2)
|- align="left" bgcolor="bbffbb"
|Mar. 11 || UNC Greensboro*|| #24 || Doug Kingsmore Stadium || Stoneburner (2–0) || Slack (0–1) || Vaughn (5) || W 11–10 || 8–4
|- align="left" bgcolor="bbffbb"
|Mar. 12 || UNC Greensboro*|| #24 || Doug Kingsmore Stadium || Zoltak (2–0) || Gilliam (1–3) || || W 6–5 || 9–4
|- align="left" bgcolor="FFBBBB"
|Mar. 14 || Boston College|| #24 || Doug Kingsmore Stadium || Doyle (2–1) || Hinson (1–3) || Hayer (1) || L 4–6 || 9–5 (1–3)
|- align="left" bgcolor="FFBBBB"
|Mar. 15 || Boston College|| #24 || Doug Kingsmore Stadium || Dean (1–1) || Harman (0–1) || Kowalski (1) || L 6–7 || 9–6 (1–4)
|- align="left" bgcolor="bbffbb"
|Mar. 16 || Boston College|| #24 || Doug Kingsmore Stadium || Stoneburner (3–0) || MacDonald (2–2) || || W 16–2 || 10–6 (2–4)
|- align="left" bgcolor="bbffbb"
|Mar. 18 || #21 Coastal Carolina*|| #31 || Doug Kingsmore Stadium || Sarratt (1–0) || Anderson (3–1) ||  || W 9–6 || 11–6
|- align="left" bgcolor="#bbbbbb"
|Mar. 19 || Furman* ||colspan=8|Postponed (rain) Rescheduled for March 20
|- align="left" bgcolor="bbffbb"
|Mar. 20 || Furman* || #31 || Doug Kingsmore Stadium || Gullickson (2–0) || Holloway (1–2) || || W 14–2 || 12–6
|- align="left" bgcolor="FFBBBB"
|Mar. 21 || #37 NC State|| #31 || Doug Kingsmore Stadium || Cutler (3–0) || Harman (0–2) || Gillheeney (4) || L 4–5 || 12–7 (2–5)
|- align="left" bgcolor="bbffbb"
|Mar. 22 || #37 NC State|| #31|| Doug Kingsmore Stadium || Mitchell (2–2) || Shunick (2–2) || Vaughn (6)|| W 3–2 || 13–7 (3–5)
|- align="left" bgcolor="bbffbb"
|Mar. 23 || #37 NC State|| #31 || Doug Kingsmore Stadium || Stoneburner (4–0) || McConnell (2–1) || || W 2–0 || 14–7 (4–5)
|- align="left" bgcolor="bbffbb"
|Mar. 25 || #44 Elon*|| #28 || Doug Kingsmore Stadium || Zoltak (3–0) || Harrilchak (2–1) || Vaughn (7)|| W 5–4 || 15–7
|- align="left" bgcolor="bbffbb"
|Mar. 26 || #44 Elon*|| #28 || Doug Kingsmore Stadium || Gullickson (3–0) || Porter (1–1) || Hinson (1) || W 2–1 || 16–7
|- align="left" bgcolor="bbffbb"
|Mar. 28 || @ Maryland|| #28 || Shipley Field || Mitchell (3–2) || Swinson (3–3) || Vaughn (8) || W 2–1 || 17–7 (5–5)
|- align="left" bgcolor="FFBBBB"
|Mar. 29 || @ Maryland|| #28 || Shipley Field || Kolarek (1–0) || Sarratt (1–1) || Quinn (4) || L 3–5  || 17–8 (5–6)
|- align="left" bgcolor="bbffbb"
|Mar. 30 || @ Maryland|| #28 || Shipley Field || Hinson (2–3) || Kearney (0–1) ||  || W 6–2 || 18–8 (6–6)
|- align="left" bgcolor="FFBBBB"
|April 1 || @ #36 Georgia*|| #26 || Foley Field || McRee (4–1) || Gullickson (1–1) || || L 3–11 || 18–9
|- align="left" bgcolor="FFBBBB"
|April 2 || #36 Georgia*|| #26 || Doug Kingsmore Stadium || Esmonde (1–0) || Harman (0–3) || Fields (7) || L 4–6 || 18–10
|- align="left" bgcolor="FFBBBB"
|April 4 || @ #2 Miami (FL)|| #26 || Mark Light Field || Bellamy (4–0) || Vaughn (0–1) || || L 4–6 || 18–11 (6–7)
|- align="left" bgcolor="FFBBBB"
|April 5 || @ #2 Miami (FL)|| #26 || Mark Light Field  || Bellamy (5–0) ||  Harman (0–4)|| Gutierrez (7) || L 5–15 || 18–12 (6–8)
|- align="left" bgcolor="FFBBBB"
|April 6 || @ #2 Miami (FL)|| #26 || Mark Light Field  || Guerra (1–0) || Hinson (2–4) || Gutierrez (8) || L 6–7 || 18–13 (6–9)
|- align="left" bgcolor="FFBBBB"
|April 9 || @ #14 South Carolina*|| #37 || Sarge Frye Field || Godwin (3–2) || Gullickson (3–2) || || L 1–7 || 18–14 
|- align="left" bgcolor="FFBBBB"
|April 11 || #4 North Carolina|| #37 || Doug Kingsmore Stadium || White (6–2) || Mitchell (3–3) || || L 2–8 || 18–15 (6–10)
|- align="left" bgcolor="FFBBBB"
|April 12 || #4 North Carolina|| #37 || Doug Kingsmore Stadium || Catapano (2–0) || Stoneburner (4–1) || Moran (1) || L 3–4 || 18–16 (6–11)
|- align="left" bgcolor="FFBBBB"
|April 13 || #4 North Carolina|| #37 || Doug Kingsmore Stadium || Catapano (3-) || Hinson (2–5) || Trice (1) || L 2–8 || 18–17 (6–12)
|- align="left" bgcolor="FFBBBB"
|April 15 || Western Carolina*||  || Doug Kingsmore Stadium || Saberhagen (3–3) || Vaughn (0–2) || Sexton (2) || L 2–6 || 18–18
|- align="left" bgcolor="FFBBBB"
|April 16 || #10 South Carolina*||  || Doug Kingsmore Stadium || Godwin (4–2) || Sarratt (1–2) ||  || L 0–6 || 18–19
|- align="left" bgcolor="bbffbb"
|April 18 || @ Duke||  || Jack Coombs Field || Mitchell (4–3) || Wolcott (3–3) || Vaughn (9) || W 7–4 || 19–19 (7–12)
|- align="left" bgcolor="FFBBBB"
|April 19 || @ Duke||  || Jack Coombs Field || Manno (4–0) || Stoneburner (4–2) || Hassan (5) || L 1–10 || 19–20 (7–13)
|- align="left" bgcolor="FFFFE6"
|April 20 || @ Duke||  || Jack Coombs Field ||  ||  || || T 6–6 || 19–20–1 (7–13–1)
|- align="left" bgcolor="bbffbb"
|April 22 || @ Western Carolina*||  || Hennon Stadium || Delk (1–0) || Ottone (1–2) || || W 6–0 || 20–20–1
|- align="left" bgcolor="bbffbb"
|April 23 || vs. Presbyterian*||  || Fluor Field at the West End || Gullickson (4–2) || Dollar (2–3) ||  || W 12–7 || 21–20–1
|- align="left" bgcolor="bbffbb"
|April 25 || Virginia Tech||  || Doug Kingsmore Stadium || Stoneburner (5–2) || Ballard (2–5 || || W 13–5 || 22–20–1 (8–13–1)
|- align="left" bgcolor="bbffbb"
|April 26 || Virginia Tech||  || Doug Kingsmore Stadium || Vaughn (1–2) || Wymer (5–5) ||  || W 8–7 || 23–20–1 (9–13–1)
|- align="left" bgcolor="bbffbb"
|April 27 || Virginia Tech||  || Doug Kingsmore Stadium || Mitchell (5–3) || Hahn (2–5) || || W 10–2 || 24–20–1 (10–13–1)
|- align="left" bgcolor="ffbbbb"
|May 3 || #3 Florida State||  || Doug Kingsmore Stadium || Strauss (7–0) || Harman (0–5) ||Posey (5) || L 8–9 || 24–21–1 (10–14–1)
|- align="left" bgcolor="ffbbbb"
|May 4 || #3 Florida State||  || Doug Kingsmore Stadium || Villanueva (5–2) || Stoneburner (5–3) || || L 4–13 || 24–22–1 (10–15–1)
|- align="left" bgcolor="ffbbbb"
|May 5 || #3 Florida State||  || Doug Kingsmore Stadium || Parker (5–1) || Delk (1–1) || Marshall (2)|| L 2–4 || 24–23–1 (10–16–1)
|- align="left" bgcolor="bbffbb"
|May 7 || vs. Furman*||  || Fluor Field at the West End || Zoltak (4–0) || Hale (1–1) || || W 11–5 || 25–23–1
|- align="left" bgcolor="ffbbbb"
|May 9 || @ Georgia Tech||  || Russ Chandler Stadium || Duncan (7–2) || Mitchell (5–4) || || L 1–5 || 25–24–1 (10–17–1)
|- align="left" bgcolor="ffbbbb"
|May 10 || @ Georgia Tech||  || Russ Chandler Stadium || Burns (6–4) || Stoneburner (5–4) || || L 1–7 || 25–25–1 (10–18–1)
|- align="left" bgcolor="bbffbb"
|May 11 || @ Georgia Tech||  || Russ Chandler Stadium || Delk (2–1) || Von Tersch || || W 16–6 || 26–25–1 (11–18–1)
|- align="left" bgcolor="bbffbb"
|May 13 || College of Charleston*||  || Doug Kingsmore Stadium || Harman (1–5) || Caulfield (4–3) || || W 12–6 || 27–25–1
|- align="left" bgcolor="bbffbb"
|May 15 || @ Central Florida*||  || Jay Bergman Field || Mitchell (6–4) ||  Sweat (5–4)|| || W 9–1 || 28–25–1
|- align="left" bgcolor="bbffbb"
|May 16 || @ Central Florida*||  || Jay Bergman Field || Stoneburner (6–4) || Herold (4–4) || Vaughn (10) || W 7–3 || 29–25–1
|- align="left" bgcolor="bbffbb"
|May 17 || @ Central Florida*||  || Jay Bergman Field || Sarratt (2–2) || Griggs (1–4) || Vaughn (11) || W 8–5 || 30–25–1
|- align="left"
| colspan=11|*Non-Conference Game. #Rankings from ESPN/USA Today Coaches Poll.
|-

|- align="left" bgcolor="ffbbbb"
|May 21 || vs. #1 Miami (FL)|| #8 || Baseball Grounds of Jacksonville || Hernandez (11–0) || Mitchell (6–5) ||  || L 1–7 || 30–26–1
|- align="left" bgcolor="ffbbbb"
|May 22 || vs. #4 N.C. State|| #8 || Baseball Grounds of Jacksonville || Shunick (6–5) || Stoneburner (6–5) ||  || L 0–10 || 30–27–1
|- align="left" bgcolor="bbffbb"
|May 24 || vs. #5 Georgia Tech|| #8 || Baseball Grounds of Jacksonville || Hinson (3–5) || Von Tersch (7–5) ||  || W 10–4 || 31–27–1
|- align="left"
| colspan=11|#Rankings indicate tournament seeds.
|-

Rankings

References 

Clemson Tigers baseball seasons
Clemson
Clemson baseball